The 2019 TitansRX International Europe Series was the first edition of TitansRX, after the Global Rallycross brand was revived and renamed in late-2018. The inaugural season was contested exclusively in Europe, with the North American and the International Series commencing in 2020. The season consisted of twelve rounds and started on 29 June with the first French round at Essay with the season culminating on 20 October, at Estering.

Calendar

Support classes 
Each round will consist of support classes as listed below.

 Round 1-2, French Division 3 and Division 4.
 Round 3-4, Supercar, Retro Rallycross (Retro, Super Retro, Group B) and Junior Rallycross.
 Round 5-6, Super1600 and Kartcross.
 Round 7-8, SuperTouringCar.
 Round 9-10, Supercar.
 Round 11-12, Spezialcross-Buggy.

Drivers

Driver and "car" changes

Championship Standings

See also
FIA European Rallycross Championship

References

External links
 

GRC Rallycross